Franz Ludwig Raufft (1660 in Luzern – 1719 in Kassel), was a German Baroque painter.

According to Houbraken he joined the Bentvueghels with the nickname "Fondament". He painted historical allegories and ceiling decorations for the Landgraaf Hessenkessel. He lived with Goudsbloem (Christian Berentz) in Hamburg after a period in Rome.

According to the RKD he lived in Paris, Rome, Hamburg, and the Hague before moving to Kassel.

References

Franz Ludwig Raufft on Artnet

Simona Sperindei, Niccolò Maria Pallavicini, mecenate, collezionista e protettore di Christian Berentz, in "Annali della Pontificia Insigne Accademia di Belle Arti e Lettere dei Virtuosi al Pantheon", XII, 2012, pp. 537–542.

1660 births
1719 deaths
German Baroque painters
People from Lucerne
Members of the Bentvueghels
Swiss painters